Ugrekhelidze is a Georgian surname. Notable people with the surname include:
Mindia Ugrekhelidze (born 1942), Georgian judge and legal academic
Tengiz Ugrekhelidze (born 1981), Georgian former football defender
Vladimer Ugrekhelidze (1939–2009), Soviet-Georgian basketball player 

Surnames of Georgian origin
Georgian-language surnames
Surnames of Abkhazian origin